Thomas Hinton was a printer in Cirencester who produced the first edition of the Cirencester Post or Gloucestershire Mercury in about October or November 1718. He is known to have been active as a printer in the town between 1709 and 1724. The Cirencester printer Samuel Rudder was married in 1749 to a Mary Hinton, and it has been speculated that Mary may have been related to Thomas Hinton.

References

Cirencester
Year of death missing
Year of birth unknown
1600s births
1700s deaths
English printers